Stephen Daye, Sr. (c.1594 – December 22, 1668) emigrated from England to the British colony of Massachusetts and became the first printer in colonial America.   He printed the Bay Psalm Book in 1640, the first book known to have been printed in the present day United States.

His printing efforts were largely motivated by the ideals of freedom of religion and freedom of the press.

Life

Daye was born in Sutton, Surrey London, and emigrated on June 7, 1638, to Cambridge, Massachusetts, on board the John of London with his wife Rebecca (Wright) Bordman (Bordman – from a previous marriage) (died October 17, 1658), sons Stephen, Jr. (died December 1, 1639), Matthew (died May 10, 1649), and stepson William Bordman (died  March 25, 1685), and three household servants. In 1638 he is recorded as being a locksmith by profession who was under financial contract to Reverend Joseph Glover to repay the loan of £51 for ship transportation for himself and his household and the cost of purchasing iron cooking utensils. Further, he was contracted to set up a printing press at Glover's home in Cambridge, Massachusetts, and to be paid wages according to Massachusetts custom. Glover died on the ship John of London during the voyage, but Daye was legally bound to fulfill his contract setting up the printing press with the aid of his sons and stepson in the home of Rev. Glover at Cambridge. Elizabeth Glover, the widow, was the legal owner of the press and Daye's debt and contract upon the death of her husband.

Most historians believe the 1639 broadsheet  The Freeman’s Oath was Daye's first publication. However, this work may have actually come second, following the printing of the first almanac composed by William Pierce. Pierce's almanac, as was typical, commenced with the month of March, which according to English law and custom was the first month of the year, rather than the Gregorian calendar that began in January. Consequently, Daye must have printed Pierce's almanac prior to the English first of the year that began on March 15. In 1640, he printed the Bay Psalm Book, the first book published in the American colonies. The next year, 1641, Daye was rewarded for his work with three hundred acres of land.

Legacy
More than a century after Daye's death, his legacy found renewed fame in Vermont, when his press came into the possession of printers Judah Spooner and Timothy Green who used it to publish the state's first newspaper in Westminster, Vermont, The Vermont Gazette, or Green Mountain Post-Boy, on February 12, 1781. In tribute to this history, in 1932 a regional literary publisher in Brattleboro was christened the Stephen Daye Press, and went on to publish local poets and writers notable to Vermont history, including Elliott Merrick and Walter Hard. With the start of World War II, that publisher would close in 1942.

References

Bibliography

 Sidney A. Kimber, The Story of an Old Press: An Account of the Hand-Press Known As the Stephen Daye Press, Upon Which Was begun in 1638 the first Printing in British North America. (Cambridge, Massachusetts : University Press, 1937)
 Robert F. Roden, Famous Presses. The Cambridge Press 1638–1692. A History of the First Printing Press Established in English America, together with a bibliographical list of the issues of the press. (New York : Dodd & Mead, 1905)

 "Daye, Stephen". The Columbia Electronic Encyclopedia, 6th ed. Copyright 2012, Columbia University Press. Online reprint (FactMonster.com). Retrieved 26 May 2006.

External links 
  – reported imprint "S. Daye"

1590s births
1668 deaths
History of Cambridge, Massachusetts
Kingdom of England emigrants to Massachusetts Bay Colony
People of colonial Massachusetts
People from the London Borough of Sutton
Colonial American printers